Goritsa (Bulgarian: Горица) is a village in eastern Bulgaria. It is located in Byala Municipality, Varna Province.

As of December 2013 the village has a population of 104.

References
 *

Villages in Varna Province